The Newport 214 is an American trailerable sailboat that was designed by Harry R. Sindle as a pocket cruiser and Midget Ocean Racing Club (MORC) racer and first built in 1975.

The Newport 214 is a development of the 1972 Newport 212.

Production
The design was built by Newport Boats in Newport, California, United States, from 1975 to 1976, but it is now out of production.

Design
The Newport 214 is a recreational sailboat, built predominantly of fiberglass, with wood trim. It has a fractional sloop rig, a raked stem, a reverse transom, a transom-hung rudder controlled by a tiller and a retractable centerboard. It displaces  and carries  of ballast. It has foam flotation for positive buoyancy.

The boat is normally fitted with a small  outboard motor for docking and maneuvering.

The design has sleeping accommodation for four people, with a double "V"-berth in the bow cabin, a straight settee to starboard in the main cabin and a drop-down table that forms a berth on the port side. The head is located under the bow "V"-berth.

Operational history
In a 2010 review Steve Henkel wrote, "the '214' came from the drawing board of Olympic sailor Harry R. Sindle, but we are not sure what to make of her racing ability. The ads say she 'will qualify for MORC competition, and performs well in such competition’—but we have not found her handicap listed in our copy of the complete U.S. Sailing PHRF compilation. Best features: The cabin arrangement seems efficient, with the centerboard trunk forming one wall of the aft dinette seat (but see below for possible problems as a result). Foam flotation is a plus. Worst features: ... the heavy steel centerboard is at the top of the trunk, and the board is cut away to a mere sliver on the aft end to permit the person sitting in the dinette to get in and out without too many contortions. Although we haven't heard of any specific instances of problems, we wouldn't be surprised if the thin section on the board led to trouble with the board bending or trunk crushing at the bottom of the boat. The drawings show a relatively slender mast section with no backstay and a total of only three shrouds—another common source of trouble (such as masts bending in a breeze)."

See also
List of sailing boat types

References

Keelboats
1970s sailboat type designs
Sailing yachts
Trailer sailers
Sailboat type designs by Harry R. Sindle
Sailboat types built by Newport Boats